The 1963 Masters Tournament was the 27th Masters Tournament, held April 4–7 at Augusta National Golf Club in Augusta, Georgia. 84 players entered the tournament and 50 made the cut at eight-over-par (152).

Jack Nicklaus, 23, won the first of his record six Green Jackets with a three-foot (0.9 m) par putt on the final hole to finish one stroke ahead of runner-up Tony Lema. Nicklaus shot a 66 (−6) in the second round, which was key in his victory. It was the second of his record 18 major titles; his third came three months later at the PGA Championship in July.

Gene Sarazen, the 1935 champion, made the cut at Augusta for the final time at age 61 and finished 49th.

It was the last Masters for Horton Smith, winner of the inaugural event in 1934 and again in 1936. He was the only competitor to have participated in every edition of the tournament, and had a lung removed in 1957. Battling Hodgkin's Disease, Smith was partly aided by a golf cart and shot 91 and 86; he died six months later in Detroit at age 55, shortly after attending the Ryder Cup matches in Atlanta.

George Bayer won the Par 3 contest with a score of 23.

Field
1. Masters champions
Jack Burke Jr. (4), Jimmy Demaret (8), Doug Ford (4,9,10,11), Claude Harmon, Herman Keiser, Cary Middlecoff (2), Byron Nelson, Arnold Palmer (2,3,8,9,11), Henry Picard, Gary Player (3,4,9,10), Gene Sarazen, Horton Smith, Sam Snead (8), Art Wall Jr. (9,11), Craig Wood
Ralph Guldahl and Ben Hogan (2,3) did not play.

The following categories only apply to Americans

2. U.S. Open champions (last 10 years)
Tommy Bolt, Billy Casper (8,11), Jack Fleck (8,10), Ed Furgol, Gene Littler (8,9,11), Dick Mayer, Jack Nicklaus (8,9,10)

3. The Open champions (last 10 years)

4. PGA champions (last 10 years)
Jerry Barber (8,11), Walter Burkemo, Dow Finsterwald (8,11), Chick Harbert, Jay Hebert (11), Lionel Hebert (8), Bob Rosburg (9)

5. U.S. Amateur and Amateur champions (last 10 years)
Charles Coe (6,8,a), Richard Davies (6,a), Labron Harris Jr. (6,7,a)

Deane Beman (6,9) and Harvie Ward did not play. Other champions forfeited their exemptions by turning professional.

6. Selections for the 1963 U.S. Walker Cup team
Robert W. Gardner (a), Downing Gray (7,a), Billy Joe Patton (7,a), R. H. Sikes (a), Charlie Smith (a), Ed Updegraff (a)

7. 1962 U.S. Amateur quarter-finalists
Homero Blancas (a), Charles Coody (a), Paul Desjardins (a), Jim Gabrielsen (a), Bill Newcomb (a)

8. Top 24 players and ties from the 1962 Masters Tournament
Julius Boros, Gay Brewer (9), Jacky Cupit, Gardner Dickinson, Paul Harney (10), Don January, Billy Maxwell (9), Johnny Pott, Mike Souchak (9,11), Ken Venturi

9. Top 16 players and ties from the 1962 U.S. Open
Bob Goalby (9), Tommy Jacobs, Bobby Nichols (10), Phil Rodgers, Doug Sanders

10. Top eight players and ties from 1962 PGA Championship
George Bayer, Dave Ragan

11. Members of the U.S. 1961 Ryder Cup team
Bill Collins

12. Two players selected for meritorious records on the fall part of the 1962 PGA Tour
Tony Lema, Jerry Pittman

13. One player, either amateur or professional, not already qualified, selected by a ballot of ex-Masters champions
Bo Wininger

14. One professional, not already qualified, selected by a ballot of ex-U.S. Open champions
Wes Ellis

15. One amateur, not already qualified, selected by a ballot of ex-U.S. Amateur champions
Bill Hyndman (a)

16. Two players, not already qualified, from a points list based on finishes in the winter part of the 1963 PGA Tour
Mason Rudolph, Dan Sikes

17. Foreign invitations
Al Balding (8), David Blair (a), Antonio Cerdá, Bob Charles, Chen Ching-Po, Bruce Crampton, Gerard de Wit, Juan Antonio Estrada (a), Jorge Ledesma (a), Stan Leonard, Ángel Miguel, Kel Nagle, Koichi Ono, Chi-Chi Rodríguez, Miguel Sala, Alvie Thompson

Numbers in brackets indicate categories that the player would have qualified under had they been American.

Round summaries

First round
Thursday, April 4, 1963

Source:

Second round
Friday, April 5, 1963

Source:

Third round
Saturday, April 6, 1963

Source:

Final round
Sunday, April 7, 1963

Final leaderboard

Sources:

Scorecard

Cumulative tournament scores, relative to par

References

External links 
 Masters.com – Past winners and results
 Augusta.com – 1963 Masters leaderboard and scorecards

1963
1963 in golf
1963 in American sports
1963 in sports in Georgia (U.S. state)
April 1963 sports events in the United States